Fabian Andre (January 8, 1910 – March 30, 1960) was an American composer, best known for co-writing the music of "Dream a Little Dream of Me" with Wilbur Schwandt in 1931. Popular in its time, the song was revived in 1968 when covered by the Mamas & the Papas.

As an orchestra leader, he had a hit with the song "Dance of an Ear of Corn" for Columbia Records in July 1940.

Death
In 1960, Andre was found dead in his hotel room in Mexico City. An autopsy determined the cause of death to be "alcoholic congestion". Years later, the Mamas and the Papas decided to record "Dream a Little Dream of Me" after member Michelle Phillips got word that Andre, whom she met in her childhood, had died supposedly in a fall down an elevator shaft.

References

External links
 Fabian Andre Biography at IMDB

1910 births
1960 deaths
American male composers
Musicians from Wisconsin
20th-century American composers
Columbia Records artists
20th-century American male musicians